Vlad Tuinov (born February 10, 1998 in Orel, Russia) is a professional Russian kickboxer who competes in the lightweight division.

Early life 
Tuinov was born in Orel, Russia to Russian parents. He got involved with kickboxing by accident. Vlad was in fact on his way to a public swimming pool at a local sports center when he walked into the wrong door and right into a class being taught by Andrey Chadin. After talking to each other Vlad decided to start training in kickboxing.

Professional kickboxing career 
After 11 professional fights, Vlad fought fellow up-and-coming Russian kickboxer Alexander Kotov on May 9, 2014, in a 5 round fight for the FKR 60 kg Russian title. Vlad would go on to win by unanimous decision. That same year on August 4, Vlad would again go up against another Russian fighter for a second title. This time Vlad defeated Murad Abdulaev for the WFMC 65 kg Russian title by 4th round KO.    

Two years later, on March 6, 2016 Vlad defeated Serbian fighter Nikola Cimesa by unanimous decision, in a 5 round fight, for the WKU 71 kg European title. Later that year, Vlad added W5's coveted 71 kg European title to his waist, when he defeated Turkey's Erkan Varol by TKO in round 3.    

2017 turned out be a very successful year for Vlad as he hoisted 3 more titles and twice defended his W5 71 kg European title. On April 6, in a winner takes all fight, Vlad defeated the Dutchman Massaro Glunder by unanimous decision, in a 5 round fight, to retain his W5 71 kg European title and add the 72.5 kg W5 Intercontinental title.  On June 17, Vlad defeated France's Bryton Mabel by unanimous decision in 5 rds to become the MTA 71 kg European champion. On September 16 Vlad defended his 71 kg W5 European belt for the second time. He defeated the tough Danish fighter Rhassan Muhareb in what would prove to be a very tough battle for Vlad, as Rhassan was not only able to withstand numerous knock out shots that Vlad was landing but was also finding multiple ways to get through Vlad's defense and land quite a few devastating blows himself. However, by rd. 5, Rhassan was not able to keep up the pace that Vlad had set and ended up being TKO-ed in rd. 5. Later that year, on October 19 Vlad defeated Yazid Boussaha to win his 3rd title of the year, the A1 72 kg World title.

On January 17, 2019 Vlad Tuinov signed a two year contract with Glory. In his debut fight, on June 22, 2019, Tuinov lost by Split Decision to Michael Palandre at Glory 66 in Paris. On October 12, 2019, Vlad fought his second fight under Glory where he defeated Artur Saladiak at Glory 69 in Dusseldorf, Germany.

From October 19–27 Vlad fought in the WAKO Senior World Championships where he won gold against Nikola Todorovic, who was the 2019 Combat Games winner. To reach the finals, Vlad had to fight some top competitors in the 75 kg weight category, like Belorussian Max Spodarenko, Turkish Ali Cakir, who Vlad faced and defeated by K.O. in the first round at W5's 2017 Grand Prix "Kitek" and Bulgarian Teodor Hristov. Vlad won each bout 3:0, but in the semi-finals against Teodor, Vlad was badly cut. However, he was able to overcome the injury and win in the finals 3:0 to take gold.

Bare knuckle boxing career
Tuinov made his bare-knuckle boxing debut against Makhmud Musalov, also known as "Chess Player" at Top Dog FC 9	on June 25, 2021. He won the fight by a second-round knockout, flooring Musalov with a right cross.

On the 24th of September, 2021 at the Top Dog FC X event Tuinov faced Vitalii "Chubatiy Pidor" Kovalenko, a fighter from Ukraine where "Chubatiy Pidor" got brutally knocked out in the second round. 

Tuinov faced Pavel Shelest at Top Dog FC 15	on July 16, 2022. The fight ended in a draw, as neither fighter was able to knock the other out within the allotted three rounds.

Professional boxing career
Tuinov made his boxing debut against Julian Lane on October 7, 2022. He won the fight by a second-round knockout.

Titles and accomplishments

Professional
World version W5
 2017 W5 72.5 kg Intercontinental Champion
 2016 W5 71.0 kg European Champion (2 defenses)
 2016 KO of the Year Award
 2016 Bout of the Year Award
 2016 Fighter of the Year Award

World Kickboxing and Karate Union
 2016 WKU 71.0 kg European Champion  

Mix Fight Championship
 2021 MFC 72.5 kg Tournament Champion

Orel Professional Kickboxing League
 2021 OPKL Pro International 75 kg Champion

A1 Partouche Kickboxing Tour
 A1 72.0 kg Champion

World Sport Fight Martial Arts Council
 2014 WFMC 65.0 kg Russian Champion

 2017 MTA 72.0 kg European Champion
 2014 FKR 60.0 kg Russian Champion

Amateur
Kickboxing

 2011 All-Russian Juniors Martial Arts Games Kickboxing Winner
 2010 I.L.K. Junior  World Cup Kickboxing Winner

Russian Savate Federation
 2009 Russian Savate Championships Winner

World Pan Amateur Kick Boxing Association
 2007 WPKA European Kickboxing Championships Silver Medal

Russian Kickboxing Federation
 3x Russian Kickboxing Championships K-1 Winner (2014, 2015, 2016)
 2011 Russian Kickboxing Championships Full-contact Winner

World Association of Kickboxing Organizations
 2019 WAKO World Championships K-1 -75kg Gold Medal & Best Competitor Award
 2019 WAKO Russian Kickboxing Championships K-1 Winner
 2014 WAKO Junior World Championships K-1 -67kg Gold Medal
 2013 WAKO Diamond World Cup Junior K-1 Winner

Mixed Martial Arts
 2012 CIS and Baltic MMA Championships Winner
International Federation of Elite Fighting
 2013 IFEF CK-2 Elite Fighting European Cup Winner
 2013 Elite FIghting World Championships Winner
 2012 IFEF CK-2 Elite Fighting European Cup Winner

Boxing
Russian Boxing Federation
 2012 Russian Boxing Championships Bronze Medal

Viet Vo Dao
Russian Vovinam Viet Vo Dao Federation
 2011 Russian Viet Vo Dao Championships Winner
 2010 Russian Vovinam Championships Winner

Kickboxing Record 

|- align="center" bgcolor= "#cfc"
| 2021-12-11 || Win ||align=left| Johannes Baas || Mix Fight Championship: Fight Club, Final || Frankfurt, Germany || Decision || 3
|-
! colspan="8" style="background:white" |
|-
|- align="center" bgcolor= "#cfc"
| 2021-12-11 || Win ||align=left| Christian Baya || Mix Fight Championship: Fight Club, Semi Finals || Frankfurt, Germany || Decision || 3
|-
|- align="center" bgcolor= "#cfc"
| 2021-10-23 || Win ||align=left| Alisher Karimdzhonov || AliveWater Kickboxing Pro || Nizhniy Novgorod, Russia || Decision || 5
|-
! colspan="8" style="background:white" |
|-
|- style="background:#fbb;"
| 2019-12-07 ||Loss|| align="left" | Bruno Gazani||Glory 73: Shenzen||Shenzen, China||KO||3
|-
|- style="background:#cfc;"
|  2019-10-12 ||Win|| align="left" | Artur Saladiak|| Glory 69: Düsseldorf ||Dusseldorf, Germany||Unanimous Decision||3
|-
|- style="background:#fbb;"
|  2019-06-22 ||Loss || align="left" | Michael Palandre|| Glory 66: Paris||Paris, France ||Decision (Split)||3
|- style="background:#cfc;"
|  2018-12-08 || Win || align="left" | Mindaugas Narauskas ||Trieste Fight Night||Trieste, Italy||Unanimous Decision ||3
|-
|- style="background:#cfc;"
|  2018-11-24 || Win || align="left" | Mathieu Tavares ||Nuit Des Champions 25||Marseille, France||KO ||3
|-
|- style="background:#fbb;"
|  2018-10-13 || Loss || align="left" | Dzianis Zuev || Kunlun Fight 77 || Tongling, China ||Majority Decision||3
|-
|- style="background:#cfc;"
|  2018-08-05 || Win || align="left" | Ismael Benali || Kunlun Fight 75 || Sanya, China ||Unanimous Decision||3
|-
|- style="background:#cfc;"
|  2018-04-15 || Win|| align="left" | Tomoyuki Nishikawa || Kunlun Fight 72 || Beijing, China ||KO||1
|-
|- style="background:#cfc;"
|  2018-04-15 || Win || align="left" | Yassin Baltar || Kunlun Fight 72 || Beijing, China ||Unanimous Decision||3
|-
|- style="background:#cfc;"
|  2018-03-23 || Win || align="left" | Yu Hirono || ACB KB 14: Diamonds || Orel, Russia ||Unanimous Decision||3
|-
|- style="background:#cfc;"
|  2017-11-25 || Win || align="left" | Ridvan Guden || Kingz Fight Night IV || Lüdenscheid, Germany ||Unanimous Decision||3
|-
|- style="background:#cfc;"
|  2017-10-19 || Win || align="left" | Yazid Boussaha || World Grand Prix «A1»  (Final) || Lyon, France || TKO || 1
|-
! colspan="8" style="background:white" |
|-
|- style="background:#cfc;"
|  2017-10-19 || Win || align="left" | Ludovic Millet || World Grand Prix «A1»  (Semi-final) || Lyon, France || TKO || 1
|-
|- style="background:#cfc;"
|  2017-09-16 || Win || align="left" | Rhassan Muhareb || W5 "Legends Collide" || Koper, Slovenia || TKO || 5 
|-
! colspan="8" style="background:white" |
|-
|- style="background:#cfc;"
|  2017-07-17 || Win || align="left" | Bryton J. Mabel || Sangiusto Fight Nights || Trieste, Italy || Unanimous Decision || 5 
|-
! colspan="8" style="background:white" |
|-
|- style="background:#cfc;"
|  2017-06-05 || Win || align="left" | Sebastien Harms-Mendez || Mix Fight Gala 21 || Hellbronn, Germany || Unanimous Decision || 3 
|-
|- style="background:#cfc;"
|  2017-04-08 || Win || align="left" | Massaro Glunder || W5 "The Undefeated" || Dubrovnik, Croatia || Unanimous Decision || 5 
|-
! colspan="8" style="background:white" |
|-
|- style="background:#cfc;"
|  2017-02-18 || Win || align="left" | Ali Cakir || W5 Grand Prix KITEK XXXIX || Moscow, Russia || KO || 1 
|-
|- style="background:#cfc;"
|  2016-12-03 || Win || align="left" | Wu Jianan || Mix Fight Gala 20 || Frankfurt am Main, Germany || KO || 1 
|-
|- style="background:#cfc;"
|  2016-10-08 || Win || align="left" | Erkan Varol || W5 "Legends in Prague" || Prague, Czech Republic || TKO || 3 
|-
! colspan="8" style="background:white" |
|-
|- style="background:#fbb;"
|  2016-06-18 || Loss || align="left" | Milan Pales || W5 & Rebuy Stars "Fortune Favors the Brave" || Prievidza, Slovakia || Split Decision || 4 
|-
|- style="background:#cfc;"
|  2016-06-04 || Win || align="left" | Luka Tomic || W5 & Rebuy Stars "Fortune Favors the Brave" || Zagreb, Croatia || Unanimous Decision || 3 
|-
|- style="background:#cfc;"
|  2016-05-21 || Win || align="left" | Angaar Nasr || W5 "Never Give Up" || Vienna, Austria || Split Decision || 3 
|-
|- style="background:#cfc;"
|  2016-04-23 || Win || align="left" | Cedric Manhoef || W5 Grand Prix KITEK || Moscow, Russia || Unanimous Decision || 3 
|-
|- style="background:#cfc;"
|  2016-03-06 || Win || align="left" | Nikola Cimesa || Vienna Fight Night || Vienna, Austria || Unanimous Decision || 5 
|-
! colspan="8" style="background:white" |
|- style="background:#cfc;"
|  2015-12-05 || Win || align="left" | Lukasz Plawecki || W5 "Winner's Energy" || Vienna, Austria || Unanimous Decision || 3 
|-
|- style="background:#cfc;"
|  2015-11-21 || Win || align="left" | Bilal Messaoudi  || KINGZ III || Ludenscheid, Germany || Unanimous Decision || 3 
|-
|- style="background:#fbb;"
|  2015-10-31 || Loss || align="left" | Jia Aoqi || Kunlun Fight 33 || Changde, China || Split Decision || 3
|-
|- style="background:#cfc;"
|  2015-08-30 || Win || align="left" | Luca Donadio || W5 "Be the Best" || Moscow, Russia || Quit || 2 
|-
|- style="background:#cfc;"
|  2015-06-05 || Win || align="left" | Kasim Ayik || Mix Fight Gala 18 || Fulda, Germany || KO || 2 
|-
|- style="background:#cfc;"
|  2015-05-15 || Win || align="left" | Wu Xuesong || Kunlun Fight 25 || Banska Bystrica, Slovakia || Unanimous Decision || 3 
|-
|- style="background:#cfc;"
|  2015-04-24 || Win || align="left" | Robert Kazikhanov || W5 Grand Prix Kitek || Moscow, Russia || KO || 3 
|-
|- style="background:#cfc;"
|  2015-03-01 || Win || align="left" | Roko Pintaric || N/A || Vienna, Austria || Unanimous Decision || 3 
|-
|- style="background:#cfc;"
|  2014-10-30 || Win || align="left" | Jan Szajko || W5 "The Crossroad of Times" || Bratislava, Slovakia || Unanimous Decision || 3 
|-
|- style="background:#cfc;"
|  2014-08-04 || Win || align="left" | Murad Abdulaev || WFMC || Orel, Russia || KO || 4 
|-
! colspan="8" style="background:white" |
|-
|- style="background:#cfc;"
|  2014-06-21 || Win || align="left" | Mohammed Soliman || W5 Grand Prix Open Air XXV || Piešťany, Slovakia || KO || 1 
|-
|- style="background:#cfc;"
|  2014-05-09 || Win || align="left" | Alexander Kotov ||FKR || Kozelsk, Russia || Unanimous Decision || 5 
|-
! colspan="8" style="background:white" |
|-
|- style="background:#cfc;"
|  2014-03-01 || Win || align="left" | Jan Szajko || W5 GRAND PRIX OREL XXIV || Orel, Russia || Unanimous Decision || 3 
|-
|- style="background:#cfc;"
|  2013-12-22 || Win || align="left" | Aleksei Krasnov || W5 Grand Prix Moscow XXIII || Moscow, Russia || KO || N/A
|-
|- style="background:#cfc;"
|  2013-11-16 || Win || align="left" | Aleksei Brosov || W5 Grand Prix Orel XXII || Orel, Russia || Unanimous Decision ||3
|-
|- style="background:#cfc;"
|  2013-01-22 || Win || align="left" | Eduard Feit || Big Kickboxing in Orel || Orel, Russia || Unanimous Decision ||3
|-
|- style="background:#cfc;"
|  2012-11-29 || Win || align="left" | Ruzil Davletshin || W5 Fighter Milk Moscow XVII || Moscow, Russia || Unanimous Decision || 3
|-
|- style="background:#cfc;"
|  2012-11-11 || Win || align="left" | Vladislav Vlasenko || W5 Fighter Milk Moscow XV || Moscow, Russia || Unanimous Decision || 3
|-
|- style="background:#cfc;"
|  2011-09-25 || Win || align="left" | Evgeny Tokov || Galaxy Fight Show || Orel, Russia || Unanimous Decision || 3
|-
|- style="background:#cfc;"
|  2011-04-13 || Win || align="left" | Agazar Zhakhmaryan || Galaxy Fight Show || Orel, Russia || Unanimous Decision || 3
|-
|- style="background:#cfc;"
|  2010-10-03 || Win || align="left" | Artyom Turov || King of Ring V || Orel, Russia || Split Decision || 3
|-
|- style="background:#cfc;"
|  2008-12-08 || Win || align="left" | Andrey Butirin || Galaxy Fight Show || Orel, Russia || Unanimous Decision || 3
|-
|-
| colspan=9 | Legend:    

|- align="center" bgcolor= "#cfc"
| 2019-10-27 || Win ||align=left| Nikola Todorovic || 2019 WAKO World Championships, Tournament Final || Sarajevo, Bosnia and Herzegovina || TKO (punches)|| 2 ||
|-
! colspan="8" style="background:white" |

|- align="center" bgcolor= "#cfc"
| 2019-10-26 || Win ||align=left| Teodor Hristov || 2019 WAKO World Championships, Tournament Semi Final || Sarajevo, Bosnia and Herzegovina || Decision (unanimous)|| 3 || 2:00

|- align="center" bgcolor= "#cfc"
| 2019-10-25 || Win ||align=left| Ali Cakir || 2019 WAKO World Championships, Tournament Quarter Final || Sarajevo, Bosnia and Herzegovina || Decision (unanimous)|| 3 || 2:00

|- align="center" bgcolor= "#cfc"
| 2019-10-24 || Win ||align=left| Maks Spadarenka || 2019 WAKO World Championships, Tournament Second Round || Sarajevo, Bosnia and Herzegovina || Decision (unanimous)|| 3 || 2:00

|- align="center" bgcolor= "#cfc"
| 2019-10-23 || Win ||align=left| Theofilos Parotsidis || 2019 WAKO World Championships, Tournament First Round || Sarajevo, Bosnia and Herzegovina || Decision (unanimous)|| 3 || 2:00
|-
| colspan=9 | Legend:

Professional boxing record

Bare knuckle record

|-
|Draw
|align=center|2–0–1
|style="text-align:left;"|Pavel Shelest
|Decision 
|Top Dog FC 15
|
|align=center|3
|align=center|2:00
|Moscow, Russia
|
|-
|Win
|align=center|2–0
|style="text-align:left;"|Vitalii Kovalenko
|KO (Right hook)
|Top Dog FC 10
|
|align=center|2
|align=center|1:20
|Moscow, Russia
|
|-
|Win
|align=center|1–0
|style="text-align:left;"|Makhmud Musalov
|KO (Right cross)
|Top Dog FC 9
|
|align=center|2
|align=center|0:33
|Moscow, Russia
|
|-

References 

Russian male kickboxers
Living people
1998 births
Kunlun Fight kickboxers
People from Oryol